These are the results of the men's team all-around competition, one of eight events for male competitors in artistic gymnastics at the 1996 Summer Olympics in Atlanta. The compulsory and optional rounds took place on July 20 and 22 at the Georgia Dome.

The 1996 Summer Olympics in Atlanta had begun a significant overhaul of artistic gymnastics in general, especially with regards to the format of competition on all events. One particularly major development was the total elimination of compulsories for all artistic gymnasts in all future competitions after these Olympics. Also, these would be the first and last Olympics to use the “7–6–5” format, which meant “SEVEN members where SIX would compete and the FIVE top scores would count towards team total” on each apparatus, for their team competitions, and for teams to consist of seven members. From the next Olympics onwards, teams would revert to competing with six members again.

Qualification
The top 12 teams at the 1995 World Artistic Gymnastics Championships earned places in the team all-around competition.

Results

References
Official Olympic Report
www.gymnasticsresults.com

Men's Team All-Around
Men's events at the 1996 Summer Olympics